Boontom Prasongquamdee (born 18 August 1946) is a former Thai cyclist. He competed in the team pursuit at the 1968 Summer Olympics.

References

1946 births
Living people
Boontom Prasongquamdee
Boontom Prasongquamdee
Cyclists at the 1968 Summer Olympics
Boontom Prasongquamdee
Boontom Prasongquamdee